The Otto-Hirsch-Auszeichnung (since 2012 Otto-Hirsch-Medaille) was donated in 1985 on the occasion of the 100th birthday of the ministerial councillor and Jewish Nazi victim Otto Hirsch and is awarded annually by the city of Stuttgart together with the  e. V. and the Jewish Religious Community to personalities who have rendered outstanding services to Christian-Jewish cooperation.

Prize laureates 
1985: Otto Küster
1986: Edgar Winkler
1987: Fritz Majer-Leonhard, Pfarrer a. D.
1988: Josef Warscher
1989: Otfried Sander, Bürgermeister a. D.
1990: Jenny Heymann
1991: Albrecht Goes
1992: Rudolf Pfisterer
1993: Elisabet Plünnecke
1994: Heinz M. Bleicher
1995: Manfred Rommel, Oberbürgermeister a. D.
1996: Rachel Dror
1997: Walter Ott
1998: Rolf Thieringer, Erster Bürgermeister a. D.
1999: Meinhard Tenné
2000: Paul Sauer
2001: Noemi Berger
2002: Heinz Lauber
2003: Arno Fern
2004: Helmuth Rilling
2005: Michael Wieck
2006: Reinhold Mayer (1926–2016)
2007: Karl-Hermann Blickle
2008: Helene Schneiderman
2009: Joachim Hahn (evangelischer Theologe)
2010: Joseph Rothschild
2011: Gunter Demnig
2012: Traute Peters.
2013: Leopold Paul Rosenkranz.
2014: Initiative Gedenkstätte Killesberg
2015: Kolja Lessing.
2016: Gabriele Müller-Trimbusch
2017:  Beate Müller, Jörg Titze
2018: Michael Volkmann.
2019: Michael Kashi
2020: Robert Jütte
2021: Monika Renninger
2022: Michael Blume und Hartmut Metzger

Awards 

Since 2013, a small sculpture designed by the artist Christine Braun has been presented as an award. It consists of translucent concrete and red broad sheet glass. The design of the award picks up on the special nature of understanding between religions: "[...] permeability, connection, overcoming the divisive – in order to achieve reconciliation, peaceful, tolerant coexistence."

References

External links 
 Otto-Hirsch-Auszeichnung

German awards
Stuttgart
Awards established in 1985